Ioannis (Yiannis) Psycharis (Greek: Ιωάννης (Γιάννης) Ψυχάρης; French: Jean Psychari; 1854–1929) was a French philologist of Greek origin, author and promoter of Demotic Greek.

Biography 
Psycharis was born on 15 May 1854 in Odessa (in modern-day Ukraine, then part of the Russian Empire), in a merchant family of Chiot descent. His mother died when he was a child, and he was raised by his grandmother in Marseille. He also spent some time with his father in Constantinople and later moved to Paris.

He studied at the École des langues orientales.

Career
Psycharis was director of studies at the École pratique des hautes études after 1885, and then professor at the École des langues orientales from 1903 to 1928, succeeding .

In 1886, he made a trip to Greece out of which he wrote My Journey, advocacy of Demotic Greek (with some remarks on the Ancient Greek pronunciation), which connected it with the national integration (Megali Idea). So he became the mentor of the Demotic side in the Greek language question. Because of his stance, in favour of Demotiki, he was heavily criticized by both the conservative political and educational establishment in Greece (most notably professor Georgios Hatzidakis), and he was often under attack by various newspapers.

Psycharis was the populariser of the term diglossia,, which describes a language community's simultaneous use of the genuine mother tongue of the present day, the vernacular, and a dialect from centuries earlier in the history of the language. The vernacular is of low prestige and is discouraged or totally forbidden for written use and formal spoken use, while the obsolete dialect is of high prestige and is used for most written communication and for formal speeches by institutions of authority such as government and religious institutions. Diglossia was a major issue in Greek society and politics in the 19th and 20th centuries (see Greek language question).

Psycharis also proposed an innovative orthography for Greek that never really caught on, despite being the focus of several serious attempts at implementation continuing into the late 20th century. A beginning Modern Greek textbook for foreign students, Ellinika Tora (Greek Now), employs some of his suggestions such as substituting rho for lambda when the pronunciation of the glide is conditioned by the other sounds around it – thus αδερφός (aderfos) instead of standard αδελφός (adelphos).  While that and other of his suggestions more accurately reflect true pronunciation, they seem to have little chance of being adopted.

During the Dreyfus affair, Psycharis defended Alfred Dreyfus, who had been falsely accused of treason because he was Jewish. Moreover, Psycharis supported his friend Emile Zola's publication of J'accuse…!, a public letter in defense of Dreyfus.

Personal life
In 1882, he married Ernest Renan's daughter, Noémie.

Death
Psycharis died in Paris on 29 September 1929. He is buried in Chios.

Works

See also 
 Musée de la Vie romantique, Hôtel Scheffer-Renan, Paris

References

External links
 
 

1854 births
1929 deaths
Writers from Marseille
People from Odessky Uyezd
Emigrants from the Russian Empire to France
French people of Greek descent
French educators
Modern Greek-language writers
Linguists from France
French philologists
French human rights activists